Lost Ranch is a 1937 American Western film produced and directed by Sam Katzman starring Tom Tyler.

Plot summary 
Rancher John Carroll disappears and the Cattlemen's Protective Association sends agents Tom Wade and Happy Baldwin to look into it.

Cast 
Tom Tyler as Tom Wade
Jeanne Martel as Rita Carroll
Howard Bryant as Happy Baldwin
Slim Whitaker as Sheriff
Theodore Lorch as Charlie Merkle, Carson Henchman
Forrest Taylor as Bart Carson
Marjorie Beebe as Minnie - Rita's friend
Lafe McKee as John Carroll - Rita's Father
Roger Williams as Terry, Carson Henchman

Soundtrack 
 Tom Tyler - "Tucson Mary"

External links 

Review of film at Variety

1937 films
1937 Western (genre) films
American black-and-white films
American Western (genre) films
Films directed by Sam Katzman
1930s English-language films
1930s American films